Shahanur Rahman (born 25 April 1996) is a Bangladeshi cricketer. He made his first-class debut for Sylhet Division in the 2016–17 National Cricket League on 25 September 2016. He is an off-spinner who bats in the lower middle order.

In his third match, against Chittagong Division, he scored 102 in Sylhet's first innings then took 5 for 66 in Chittagong's first innings.

He made his List A debut for Partex Sporting Club in the 2016–17 Dhaka Premier Division Cricket League on 12 April 2017.

References

External links
 

1996 births
Living people
Bangladeshi cricketers
Partex Sporting Club cricketers
Sylhet Division cricketers
People from Sylhet